Takht is a city in Takht Rural District, Takht District, Bandar Abbas County, Hormozgan Province, Iran. At the 2006 census, its population was 2,287, in 527 families.

References 

Populated places in Bandar Abbas County
Cities in Hormozgan Province